James "Bubba" Busceme (born 14 February 1952), is a retired American boxer, who became one of the most celebrated American amateur boxers in history.

Amateur career
His amateur record is reported to be 520-13. He competed at 132 pounds at the 1972 Munich Olympics.

1972 Olympic results
Below is the record of James Busceme, an American lightweight boxer who competed at the 1972 Munich Olympics:

 Round of 64: bye
 Round of 32: defeated Praianan Vichit (Thailand) by decision, 5-0
 Round of 16: lost to Jan Szczepanski (Poland) by decision, 0-5

Personal
In his post-boxing career, Busceme is a school teacher in Belize, the only official English-speaking country in Central America.

External links
 databaseOlympics

References

Living people
Boxers from Texas
Olympic boxers of the United States
Boxers at the 1972 Summer Olympics
1952 births
American male boxers
Boxers at the 1971 Pan American Games
Pan American Games medalists in boxing
Pan American Games bronze medalists for the United States
Lightweight boxers
Medalists at the 1971 Pan American Games
20th-century American people
21st-century American people